As a non-profit NGO founded in 1997, the Vietnam Human Rights Network (VNHRN) – named Mạng Lưới Nhân Quyền Việt Nam in Vietnamese - consists of several human rights activists and organizations committed to the defense and promotion of human rights and civil liberties entitled to all Vietnamese citizens. To fulfill its mission, the Network focuses its operations on the rights set forth by the Universal Declaration of Human Rights and subsequent international human rights instruments. Members of the VNHRN are present in many countries worldwide, and its headquarters are in Orange County, California, U.S.A.

Formation of the VNHRN 

Toward the end of the 1990s, the increasing repression of dissidents by the Vietnamese authorities at home and the collapse of many communist dictatorial regimes in Eastern Europe, encouraged many Vietnamese human rights activists worldwide to come together for collective actions. As a result, on November 1, 1997, a founding convention was held in Santa Ana, California, gathering a consortium of activists representing various human rights organizations worldwide. After two days of deliberation, they decided to establish the Vietnam Human Rights Network. A By-laws was adopted to serve as the basis for the organization’s operation. By 2000 the VNHRN obtained its 501(c)(3) tax-exempt status from the U.S. Internal Revenue Service.

Since its founding, the VNHRN has held up to now (2021) fifteen Conventions gathering participants from many countries to go over past operations, assess the human rights situations in Vietnam and the world, and layout the general directions and future activities.

Organization 

As a network, participating organizations are entirely equal in their standing and votes. The only condition is that they work together on joint projects while retaining their identity as individual organizations with their activities. For coordination purposes, VNHRN consists of three central bodies: the Coordinating Committee, The Supervisory Board, and the Advisory Board.
Up to now (2021), the following four persons have been entrusted with the function of heading the Coordination Committee: Prof. Nguyen Thanh Trang (1997–2005 and 2007–2009), Mr. Le Minh Nguyen (2005–2007), Mr. Nguyen Kim Binh (2017-2019, and Dr. Nguyen Ba Tung (2007-2017, and 2019 up to present).

Typical Activities 

Three main goals of VNHRN’s activities are:

Information and Education

 Producing Human Rights Newsletter.
 Establishing a website on the Internet to rapidly disseminate human rights news and   developments
 Translating and publishing the International Human Rights Code,  documents and writings on human rights for dissemination both inside Vietnam and in the Diaspora.  
 Organizing human rights seminars and conferences in Montreal (Canada), Sydney (Australia), Munich (Germany), Paris (France), Washington DC, New York (NY), Orlando (FL), New Orleans (LA), Houston and Dallas (TX), Westminster, Los Angeles, San Jose, Sacramento, and San Diego (CA), Seattle and Tacoma (WA), Denver (CO), etc ... 
 Publishing Annual Human Rights Reports (since 2009).

Seeking International Support

 Cooperating with international human rights organizations such as American and Chinese, Burmese and Tibetan NGOs, as well as with the United Nations Human Rights Commissioner's Office, the UN Human Rights Council, Amnesty International, Human Rights Watch, Reporters sans Frontières, etc...
 Participating in the Vietnam Human Rights Day (May 11 every year) held annually at the U.S. Senate since 1998.
 Meeting with both executive and legislative branches of a number of countries so as to seek support for human rights in Vietnam, such as a meeting held with U.S. President George W. Bush and Vice President Dick Cheney in the White House (on 29 May 2007), or one with Honorable Geoffrey Harris, Chairman of the Human Rights Committee of the European Union (on 6 May 2008)…
 Participating in several international conferences on human rights, such as the  2000 United Nations Millennium Forum in New York, the 2003 International Conference for Human Rights in the Netherlands, the First World Forum for Democratization in Asia (Taipei, Taiwan, 2005), the Third International Conference on Human Rights Education in Cracow Poland, 2012…

Providing Support to Activists inside Vietnam

 Establishing annual Vietnam Human Rights Awards and awarding them to outstanding human rights activists (since 2002). 
 Helping financially and for medical reasons those activists who run into difficulties.

The Vietnam Human Rights Awards 

Since 2002, the Vietnam Human Rights Network has presented annual Awards to selected human rights activists and organizations in Vietnam who have made their mark in the inexorable march towards freedom, human rights, and democracy of the Vietnamese people. It is also an opportunity for Vietnamese people in the Diaspora to express their solidarity with and support those involved in the relentless fighting for fundamental rights and justice for Vietnamese people. The prize-awarding ceremony was held every year in different locations worldwide on International Human Rights Day (December 10). 
After over two decades of existence, the Vietnam Human Rights Awards have received positive marks from both inside and outside of Vietnam, despite sharp criticism by the Vietnamese authorities.

List of VNHRA Recipients

Annual Report of the VNHRN 

The Vietnam Human Rights Network has published its annual reports on Human Rights in Vietnam as of 2009.  The reports outline recent human rights developments in Vietnam and egregious human rights violations by the government of Vietnam against its citizens' fundamental rights. As cooperative works of many human rights activists in Vietnam and in the Diaspora, those annual reports give a truthful picture of the human rights situation in Vietnam. Original stories are cross-checked and compared with related sources, such as social networks (Facebook, individual blogs, Twitter, etc.), international news or research organizations, and even Vietnamese government news sources and data. 
The reports include several chapters corresponding to the fundamental human rights set forth by the Universal Declaration of Human Rights. Recommendations include concrete and feasible propositions sent to the Vietnam government. The reports also include appendices listing prisoners of conscience currently held in jail.

Award 
On May 27, 2018, The Visual Artists Guild  presented the Vietnam Human Rights Network with the Spirit of Tiananmen Award for its human rights activities over the past two decades on the 28th anniversary of the Tiananmen Square protests and massacre.

Criticism 
The existence and activities of VNHRN have drawn fierce criticism from the Vietnamese authorities as "a reactionary organization of Vietnamese in exile... hiding behind the shield of 'democracy and human rights' to oppose the Vietnamese government through slander and distortions."

References

Human rights organizations based in the United States
Organizations based in California
Human rights in Vietnam